Juan Escutia Olivares (15 December 1895 – 5 October 1933) was a Mexican sprinter. He competed in the men's 400 metres at the 1924 Summer Olympics. He was killed after being hit by a train in 1933.

References

External links
 

1895 births
1933 deaths
Athletes (track and field) at the 1924 Summer Olympics
Mexican male sprinters
Mexican male middle-distance runners
Olympic athletes of Mexico
Place of birth missing
Railway accident deaths in Mexico